MV Mwanza is a Lake Victoria ferry operating on Lake Victoria in Tanzania. The ferry is a Ro-Pax ferry that operates between the villages of Kigongo and Busisi south of Mwanza town across the Mwanza Gulf in east-west direction. MV Mwanza is not the only ferry along the route (there are three other ferries) which highlights the relevance of the ferry service.

The ferry, now the largest Ro-Pax ferry on Lake Victoria, has two decks for vehicles and goods (main deck and boat deck) and an indoor passenger deck with seats. It was constructed by a local Tanzanian construction company in Mwanza, Songoro Marine Transport.

References

2018 ships
Ferries of Tanzania